Shakuntala Barua is an Indian actress. She was born in Kolkata.

Filmography

 Tonic (film) (2021)
 Sahaj Paather Gappo (2016)
 Chaap – The Pressure (2013)
 Phire Eso Tumi (2012)
 Amrita (2012)
 Aaro Kachha Kachhi (2012)
 Aami Montri Hobo (2011)
 Peeriti Kanthaler Aantha (2011)
 Sedin Dekha Hoyechilo (2010)
 Bejanma (2010)
 Moner Ajante (2009)
 Pitribhumi (2007)
 Nayak (2006)
 Biswasghatak (2003)
 Parinati (2001)
 Shesh Ashray (2001)
 Srimoti Bhayonkari (2001)
 Apan Holo Par (2000)
 Harjit (2000)
 Kalankini Badhu (2000)
 Kulangar (2000)
 Prem Priti Bhalobasa (2000)
 Sajoni Aamar Sohag (2000)
 Shesh Thikana (2000)
 Atmiyoswajan (1999)
 Dabidar (1999)
 Daye Dayitwa (1999)
 Jugabatar Loknath (1999)
 Dahan (1998)
 Jamai No.1 (1998)
 Sagar Banya (1998)
 Jiban Sandhan (1997)
 Joyee (1997)
 Maan Apaman (1997)
 Manasa Kanya (1997)
 Saptami (1997)
 Banaphul (1996)
 Sinthir Sindur (1996)
 Antarotamo (1995)
 Mashal (1995)
 Patibrata (1995)
 Shesh Pratiksha (1995)
 Baba Loknath (1994)
 Dhusar Godhuli (1994)
 Shesh Chithi (1994)
 Tumi Je Aamar (1994)
 Wheel Chair (1994)
 Atithi Shilpi (1993)
 Duranta Prem(1993)
 Kunchbaran Kanya (1993)
 Mishti Madhur (1993)
 Premi (1993)
 Sonam Raja (1993)
 Bedenir Prem (1992)
 Gunjan (1992)
 Hirer Angti (1992)
 Monikanchan (1992)
 Pratham Dekha (1992)
 Ahankar (1991)
 Katha Dilam (1991)
 Alingan (1990)
 Apan Aamar Apan (1990)
 Badnam (1990)
 Balidan (1990)
 Debata (1990)
 Ekhane Aamar Swarga (1990)
 Jibansangee (1990)
 Mandira (1990)
 Sati (1990)
 Aamar Tumi (1989)
 Akrosh (1989)
 Amanat (1989)
 Amar Prem (1989)
 Angar (1989)
 Asha O Bhalobasha (1989)
 Chokher Aloy (1989)
 Mone Mone (1989)
 Tufan (1989)
 Agaman (1988)
 Kidnap (1988)
 Ora Charjan (1988)
 Pratikar (1987)
 Amar Sangee (1987)
 Dabar Chal (1987)
 Ekanta Apan (1987)
 Gayak (1987)
Ashirbaad (1987)
 Gurudakshina (1987)
 Nyay Adhikar (1987)
 Rudrabina (1987)
 Ashirbad (1986)
 Amar Kantak (film) (1986)
 Jog Biyog (1985)
 Agnishuddhi (1984)
 Lal Golap (1984)
 Prarthana (1984)
 Shatru (1984)
 Simantarag (1984)
 Jiban Maran (1983)
 Tanaya (1983)
 Samarpan (1982)
 Sankalpa (1982)
 Pratishodh (1981)
 Surya Sakhi (1981)
 Saheb (1981)
 Rajnandini (1980)
 Sunayani (1979)

Awards

References

External links
 
 

Indian film actresses
Bengali actresses
Living people
Actresses from Kolkata
Indian Hindus
Bengali Hindus
Actresses in Bengali cinema
20th-century Indian actresses
21st-century Indian actresses
Year of birth missing (living people)